Triantafyllos Pasalidis (born 19 July 1996) is a Greek professional footballer who plays as a centre-back for Super League club OFI.

Career

Asteras Tripolis
On 14 February 2017, Asteras Tripolis officially announced that Pasalidis had signed a four-year contract, which would be made effective on 1 July. On 19 August 2017, Pasalidis made his league debut for Asteras Tripolis, in a 2–1 home defeat against PAS Giannina. On 9 September 2017, he scored his first career goal in a 3–1 home loss against Lamia. On 19 November 2017, he scored in a comfortable 3–0 away Super League win against Platanias.

OFI
On 28 May 2021, OFI officially announced the signing of Pasalidis on a three-year deal.

References

External links 
 
 

1996 births
Living people
Greek footballers
Greece under-21 international footballers
Gamma Ethniki players
Football League (Greece) players
Super League Greece players
Aiginiakos F.C. players
Asteras Tripolis F.C. players
OFI Crete F.C. players
Association football central defenders
Footballers from Thessaloniki